Andrew Fisher House is a historic home located at Newark, New Castle County, Delaware.  It was built about 1777, and is a two-story, three-bay, gable roofed brick dwelling. It has a one-story rear wing.

It was added to the National Register of Historic Places in 1972.

References

Houses on the National Register of Historic Places in Delaware
Houses completed in 1777
Houses in Newark, Delaware
National Register of Historic Places in New Castle County, Delaware